Dasyuris anceps is a species of moth in the family Geometridae. It is endemic to New Zealand.

Subspecies
Dasyuris anceps anceps Butler, 1877
 Dasyuris anceps grisescens Prout, 1939

In 1988 John S. Dugdale discussed the two subspecies of this species. In 2012 Robert Hoare in the New Zealand Inventory of Biodiversity appeared to raise the subspecies Dasyuris anceps grisescens to the species Dasyuris grisescens.

References

Larentiinae
Moths of New Zealand
Moths described in 1877
Endemic fauna of New Zealand
Taxa named by Arthur Gardiner Butler
Endemic moths of New Zealand